Teleiodes italica is a moth of the family Gelechiidae. It is found in Switzerland, northern Italy, southern France and Spain.

The length of the forewings is 4.5–6.5 mm. Adults are identical to Teleiodes vulgella.

The larvae feed on Sorbus aucuparia and Crataegus and Cydonia species.

Etymology
The species is named for Italy, where it was first discovered.

References

Moths described in 1992
Teleiodes
Moths of Europe